The Raqqa campaign (2012–2013) was a series of battles and offensives launched by various Syrian rebel groups, led by the al-Nusra Front, against Syrian government forces in the Raqqa Governorate as part of the Syrian Civil War. The campaign was launched at the second half of 2012 and ended in the capture of the city of Raqqa as well as dozens of smaller towns and facilities.

The campaign

2012 
On 19 September 2012, Free Syrian Army rebels led by the Farouq Brigades captured the border town of Tell Abyad and its border crossing with the town of Akçakale in Turkey. The next day, the Syrian Air Force bombed a petrol station in Tell Abyad, killing 30 civilians and wounding 70. A rebel fighter was also mortally wounded. In October, Syrian government forces launched a counteroffensive in Tell Abyad which resulted in a border clash between Syria and Turkey.

On 12 October 2012, the al-Nusra Front and Harakat Fajr ash-Sham al-Islamiya attacked the Suluq barracks in Raqqa and claimed to have killed 32 Syrian soldiers.

In November 2012, both the rebels and government forces set up checkpoints on the road between al-Thawrah (Tabqa) and Aleppo. By the end of December, the majority of the Raqqa province were reportedly under rebel control, and rebel fighters entered al-Thawra.

2013

Battle of al-Thawrah 
On 10 January 2013, heavy clashes erupted in the town of al-Thawra and the Syrian Air Force in Tabqa airbase shelled the town with artillery. By 11 February, rebels led by the al-Nusra Front fully captured both the town and the Tabqa Dam next to it.

Battle of Raqqa city 

On 6 March 2013, rebel forces led by the al-Nusra Front fully captured the city of Raqqa from Syrian government, forces after a 3-day battle. The Syrian Army retreated to the military base of the 17th Division, to the northeast of the city.

Aftermath 

The al-Nusra Front and Ahrar al-Sham implemented Sharia in the towns they captured. By April 2013, hundreds of Assyrians were displaced from al-Thawra. Christians, including those who supported the opposition, were kidnapped in Raqqa, al-Thawra, and Tel Abyad by al-Nusra and the Islamic State of Iraq and the Levant. ISIL also carried out public executions of dozens of people in the towns by firing squad. Political activism was also suppressed, several churches and mosques were burned, and hundreds of Armenians fled Raqqa.

Order of battle

Rebel forces 

  Free Syrian Army-affiliated groups
 Farouq Brigades
 Raqqa Revolutionaries Brigade
 Jihad in the Path of God Brigade
 Kurdish Front Brigade
 Euphrates Knights Brigade
 Free Tabqa Brigade

 Independent Islamist groups (some of which are also part of FSA)
 Islamic Unity and Liberation Front (alliance of several Islamist militias)
  Liwa Owais al-Qorani
 Nasr Saladin Brigade
 Liwa Hudhayfah ibn al-Yaman
 Muntasir Billah Brigade
 Katibat Hudheifa bin al-Yaman
 Katibat Mohammed bin Abdullah
 Katibat Musaib bin Umair
 Katibat Abu Dujana
 Katibat Saraya al-Furat
 Katibat Shuhada al-Jamaa Jund al-Rahman
 Katibat Ahrar al-Badiyah

  Syrian Islamic Liberation Front
 Ahfad al-Rasul Brigades
 Muntasir Billah Brigade
 Al-Tawhid Brigade
 Conquest Brigade
 Ghuraba al-Sham Battalion

  Syrian Islamic Front
  Ahrar al-Sham
 Liwa Umanaa’ al-Raqqa
 Liwa al-Haqq (Idlib)
 Katibat al-Bara'
 Katibat Saraya al-Furat

  Al-Qaeda affiliates and other Salafist jihadists
  Islamic State of Iraq 
  Muhajireen Battalion
 Shura Council Front
  Al-Nusra Front
 Harakat al-Fajr al-Islamiyya
 Ghuraba al-Sham
 Katibat Usud al-Sunna (part of Mujahideen Shura Council)

Government forces 
  Syrian Armed Forces
  Syrian Army
  17th Division
  Syrian Air Force
  National Defence Forces
 Military Intelligence Directorate
 Political Security Directorate

See also 
 Battle of Tell Abyad (2013)
 2015 Idlib offensive
 Raqqa campaign (2016–2017)

References

Bibliography 
 
 

Military operations of the Syrian civil war in 2012
Military operations of the Syrian civil war in 2013
Military operations of the Syrian civil war involving the al-Nusra Front
Military operations of the Syrian civil war involving the Syrian government
Military operations of the Syrian civil war involving the Islamic State of Iraq and the Levant